Jamie & Jimmy's Friday Night Feast is a UK food lifestyle programme which aired on Channel 4 in 2014. A second series began in January 2015, a third in January 2016, a fourth in December 2016 and a fifth in November 2017.

About
The programme is presented by Jamie Oliver and Jimmy Doherty.

The series is based in Jamie and Jimmy's Cafe which is based at the end of Southend Pier which is the longest Pleasure Pier in the World. Jimmy and Jamie are helped in the Cafe by one of Jamie's old students, Kerry-Anne.

Each week a celebrity guest joins Jimmy & Jamie in the Cafe and helps to cook a recipe of their choosing.

The cafe has been claimed as a set and not a real cafe, however this is not true. It was a real cafe before the last big Pier fire in 2005 that decimated the remaining Pier attractions. The Pier Train Railway Station, Jolly Fisherman Pub, Gift Shop, Fish 'n' Chip Shop, Historic Post Box, ornate RNLI Collection Box, Victorian Phone Box and Ice-Cream Shop were all destroyed in the fire.  The cafe building did however survive the fire and re-opened in 2006. Since 2013 the cafe has only been used for approximately 2 weeks per year for the filming of this show.  Visitors to the end of the Pier go to a Cultural Centre Shelter which Southend Borough Council installed in 2012.  
The cafe users are members of the public who have applied to be on the show in order to pose as diners during filming.

Episode menu
Each episode contains a menu of recipes, which consists of the following:

A Recipe for the Weekend by Jamie
In each episode Jamie cooks a recipe for the Weekend. These are usually filmed and cooked outside the Cafe, sometimes in or around his portable Pub, 'The Cock In Cider'. In Series Two these recipes came from his 'Jamie's Comfort Food' Book.

A Celebrity Guest Recipe
Each episode sees a guest come to the cafe and help cook a recipe to their choosing, usually one which has played a significant part of their life. Jamie and his research team ensure the recipe matches the original dish as best as he can to that of the recipe the Guest is familiar with.

A Food Fight Mission
Each episode Jamie & Jimmy also campaign for a food or cause in a Food Fight. In Series One Jamie and Jimmy campaigned each week to bring back and give recognition to regional recipes which were now unknown or on the decline. From Series Two Jamie and Jimmy campaigned each week to highlight an issue with Food Waste.

A DIY Food Build by Jimmy
In each episode Jimmy builds a DIY piece of cooking equipment, showing the viewers how to do it at home. This segment is filmed on Jimmy's Farm in Essex. From series 4 this focused on wild foods.

Episodes

Series 1 (2014)

Series 2 (2015)

Series 3 (2016)

Series 4 (2016–17)

Series 5 (2017–18)
Upcoming episodes will star Johnny Vegas, Josh Hartnett, Greg Davies, Chris O'Dowd, Dawn O'Porter and Craig David.

Series 6 (2018-19)

Series 6 was filmed in September 2018. The confirmed guests are Patrick Stewart, Jessica Ennis-Hill, Jodie Whittaker, Martin Freeman, Jessica Chastain, Harry Hill, Danny DeVito, Romesh Ranganathan, Stephen Fry, Russell Howard, Davina McCall and Stephen Mangan.

Jamie and Jimmy's Festive Feast (2019)
Christmas special

Series 7  (2019)

Series 7 confirmed guests are Mary Berry, Ant & Dec

Jamie and Jimmy's Festive Feast (2020)
Christmas special

Series 8 (2021)

Series 8 confirmed guests are Jack Dee, Amir Khan, Joe Lycett and Susan Sarandon. Series 8 was filmed in 2019, before the COVID-19 pandemic.

References

2014 British television series debuts
Channel 4 original programming
British cooking television shows
English-language television shows